The brown flower bat (Erophylla bombifrons) is a species of bat from the family Phyllostomidae. It is native to the island of Hispaniola, present in both Haiti and the Dominican Republic, and Puerto Rico. In most cases, the brown flower bat is recognized as part of the buffy flower bat, and there are two recognized subspecies: Erophylla bombifrons bombifrons and Erophylla bombifrons santacristobalensis.

Conservation and habitat
Under the IUCN Red List, the brown flower bat is classified as Least Concern because of its population and distribution. Locally common, the brown flower bat can form and roost in colonies of thousands of bats in cooler portions of its habitat. Major threats involve general issues with caves, as it is a hot cave species, hurricanes, and mining in its habitat; it is, however, found in conserved areas.

Diet and behaviour
Compared to other bats, the brown flower bat begins foraging rather late. Its diet consists of some combination of fruit, nectar, and insects; in a more detailed survey of its diet, 75% of specimens had eaten insects, 76% had eaten nectar, and 85% had eaten fruit, and about half had eaten all three during their most recent foraging period. Fecal pellet and fur examinations have determined that this bat often feeds on the fruit of the Jamaican cherry, elderberry, and turkey berry, while visiting the banana flower, guava, and wild tamarind for nectar.

See also 
 Buffy flower bat

References 

Mammals described in 1899
Erophylla
Taxa named by Gerrit Smith Miller Jr.
Bats of the Caribbean
Mammals of the Dominican Republic